Lakavica is a village in the municipality of Štip, North Macedonia.

Demographics
According to the 2002 census, the village had a total of 139 inhabitants. Ethnic groups in the village include:

Macedonians 107
Turks 24
Serbs 8

References

Villages in Štip Municipality